The Seal of Louisiana is the official government emblem of the State of Louisiana. Originally devised in 1812, the latest version was enacted in 2006.

History
Following the Louisiana Purchase in 1803, the area that would later comprise the State of Louisiana was established as the Territory of Orleans. President Thomas Jefferson appointed William C. C. Claiborne as governor and he was authorized by the territory's legislative council to design an official government seal. He produced a seal depicting an eagle holding a laurel wreath with fifteen stars to represent the states of the Union. When Louisiana became a state in 1812, the seal was changed to a pelican on its nest, plucking at its breast to draw blood to feed its young, a device known as the "pelican in her piety". Why the seal was changed from an eagle to a pelican is unknown, but it might have to honor the state's Catholic heritage. Claiborne had married into a Catholic Louisiana family and had helped to incorporate Catholics into the political mainstream, during a time of intense anti-Catholicism elsewhere in the US.

Prior to the Civil War, the "pelican in her piety" surrounded by the motto "Justice, Union and Confidence" was commonly used as the state's seal, after the Civil War, Union supplanted Justice as the ideal to uphold and the motto was changed to "Union, Justice and Confidence".  The Great Seal of the State of Louisiana was adopted as the official state seal of Louisiana in 1902. The seal consists of a heraldic charge of the "pelican in her piety", representing a brown pelican (the official state bird) wounding her breast to feed her young from her own blood. This symbol, emblematic of Christian charity, is also found on the Louisiana state flag. The Louisiana state motto "Union, Justice, Confidence" surrounds the birds on the state seal. An outer ring further identifies it with the words "State of Louisiana".

During the 19th century it was traditional in Louisiana flags and the state seal for the "pelican in her piety" to have three drops of blood on her chest.  However, in later years the tradition (on both the state flag and seal) had been haphazardly followed, which was noticed by an eighth-grader at Vandebilt Catholic High School in Houma who brought this to the attention of his state legislator.  The issue was resolved in April 2006, when the Louisiana State Legislature passed a bill (House Bill 833/Act 92) which requires three drops of blood to be depicted on the pelican used in both the state's flag and seal.

Historical Coats of Arms of Louisiana

Government seals of Louisiana

References

External links
Louisiana Facts

Symbols of Louisiana
Louisiana
Louisiana